Donja Šušaja is a village located in the municipality of Preševo, Serbia. According to the 2002 census, the village has a population of 342 people. Of these, 341 (99,70 %) were ethnic Albanians, and 1 (0,29 %) other.

References

Populated places in Pčinja District
Albanian communities in Serbia